The 2013 World Taekwondo Championships was the 21st edition of the World Taekwondo Championships, and was held in Puebla, Mexico from July 15 to July 21, 2013.

Medal table

Medal summary

Men

Women

Team ranking

Men

Women

Participating nations 
A total of 812 athletes from 130 nations competed.

 (2)
 (4)
 (1)
 (4)
 (10)
 (5)
 (2)
 (13)
 (3)
 (15)
 (8)
 (4)
 (1)
 (2)
 (2)
 (16)
 (3)
 (1)
 (2)
 (16)
 (2)
 (2)
 (5)
 (9)
 (16)
 (16)
 (16)
 (7)
 (10)
 (10)
 (8)
 (11)
 (1)
 (1)
 (10)
 (2)
 (10)
 (3)
 (2)
 (14)
 (6)
 (13)
 (2)
 (2)
 (13)
 (5)
 (8)
 (16)
 (2)
 (3)
 (1)
 (8)
 (3)
 (1)
 (12)*
 (5)
 (12)
 (1)
 (1)
 (1)
 (7)
 (13)
 (15)
 (5)
 (5)
 (9)
 (14)
 (4)
 (7)
 (3)
 (1)
 (4)
 (1)
 (8)
 (4)
 (4)
 (2)
 (16)
 (3)
 (6)
 (2)
 (2)
 (3)
 (6)
 (1)
 (7)
 (2)
 (6)
 (4)
 (4)
 (2)
 (2)
 (5)
 (13)
 (6)
 (3)
 (9)
 (5)
 (16)
 (7)
 (4)
 (4)
 (13)
 (3)
 (2)
 (5)
 (2)
 (3)
 (16)
 (16)
 (2)
 (4)
 (4)
 (3)
 (3)
 (9)
 (2)
 (6)
 (7)
 (16)
 (2)
 (3)
 (10)
 (1)
 (16)
 (2)
 (7)
 (2)
 (15)
 (10)

 Athletes from India competed as World Taekwondo Federation (WTF) due to the suspension of the country's Olympic Committee.

References 

Results Book

External links
 Official website

 
World Championships
World Taekwondo Championships
International taekwondo competitions hosted by Mexico
World Taekwondo Championships
Sport in Puebla (city)
Taekwondo in Mexico